Xing Yun (born March 1952) is a former Chinese politician who spent his entire career in the Inner Mongolia Autonomous Region. A career politician in China's Communist Party-run bureaucracy, Xing rose through the ranks gradually, capping his career as the top security official of Inner Mongolia. He was put under investigation for graft in October 2018, two years after he retired. At the time, he was serving as vice-chairman of the Inner Mongolia People's Congress. He was accused of taking over 400 million yuan in bribes, and sentenced to life in prison without the possibility of commutation or parole. He had the dubious distinction of having the highest recorded corrupt earnings in the history of Communist-ruled China.

Biography
Xing was born in March 1952 in Tumed Left Banner, Inner Mongolia, China. He entered the workforce in September 1968, and joined the Chinese Communist Party in March 1981. During the Cultural Revolution, He taught at a school before going to Inner Mongolia University of Technology in September 1973. In December 1976 he was assigned to the propaganda department of local government is Tumd Right Banner. In September 1987, he was appointed deputy head Shiguai District, Baotou. In December 1990, he was head and deputy Party chief of Shiguai District. He served as mayor of Ih Ju League (now Ordos City) from January 1995 to October 1996, and Communist Party Secretary, the top political position in the city, from October 1996 to December 2001. In December 2001 he was transferred back to Baotou and appointed Communist Party Secretary. In December 2006 he was promoted to become Secretary of Inner Mongolia Autonomous Region Political and Legal Affairs Commission, a position he held until November 2011. In February 2012 he became vice-chairman of the Inner Mongolia People's Congress, a position he held for almost four years until his retirement.

Downfall
On October 25, 2018, he was placed under investigation for serious violations of laws and regulations by the Central Commission for Discipline Inspection (CCDI), the party's internal disciplinary body, and the National Supervisory Commission, the highest anti-corruption agency of China. He was expelled from the Party on April 29, 2019. On August 15, 2019, the Dalian Intermediate People's Court opened in public to hear the case of Xing Yun. He had accepted properties and gifts either directly or through close relatives equivalent to 449 million yuan ($64 million). The amount set a record for the monetary value of suspected bribes or other ill-gotten gains during the anti-corruption campaign under Xi Jinping. On December 3, 2019, Xing was sentenced by the Dalian Intermediate People's Court to death with a two-year reprieve without commutation or parole when the sentence was automatically reduced to life imprisonment.

Xing's younger sister, Xing Yanju, vice chairwoman of the Standing Committee of Hohhot People's Congress, was arrested on April 29, 2019, and was expelled from the Chinese Communist Party on May 10, 2019.

References

External links
 Biography of Xing Yun 

1952 births
Inner Mongolia University of Technology alumni
Central Party School of the Chinese Communist Party alumni
Living people
People's Republic of China politicians from Inner Mongolia
Chinese Communist Party politicians from Inner Mongolia
Expelled members of the Chinese Communist Party